Tingena loxotis is a species of moth in the family Oecophoridae. This species is endemic to New Zealand and is found in the North Island. This species is found in gardens and are known to enter houses. Adults are on the wing in December and January. It is classified as "Data Deficient" by the Department of Conservation.

Taxonomy 

This species was described by Edward Meyrick in 1905 using a specimen he collected in Wellington in January. Meyrick named the species Borkhausenia loxotis. In 1926 Alfred Philpott studied the genitalia of the male of this species however his illustration does not agree with the lectotype or paralectotype specimens. George Hudson described and illustrated the species under this name in his 1928 publication The Moths and Butterflies of New Zealand. Hudson's illustration of the species is regarded as a poor representation. In 1988 John S. Dugdale assigned this species to the genus Tingena. The lectotype specimen is held at the Natural History Museum, London.

Description  
Meyrick described the species as follows:

Distribution 
This species is endemic to New Zealand. This species has been collected at the Wellington Botanic Gardens and more recently at Taihape.

Biology and behaviour 
The adults of this species is on the wing in December and January. Hudson regarded this species as having semi domesticated habits, being found in gardens and entering houses.

Conservation Status 
This species has been classified as having the "Data Deficient" conservation status under the New Zealand Threat Classification System.

References

Oecophoridae
Moths of New Zealand
Moths described in 1905
Endemic fauna of New Zealand
Taxa named by Edward Meyrick
Endemic moths of New Zealand